Tibatrochus husaensis is a species of sea snail, a marine gastropod mollusk in the family Eucyclidae.

Description
The size of the shell varies between 4 mm and 6.5 mm.

Distribution
This marine species occurs off the Philippines.

References

 Nomura, S., 1940: Mollusca dredged by the Husa-maru from the Pacific coast of Tiba Prefecture, Japan. Rec Oceanogr Works Japan 12(1): 81-116

External links
 To Encyclopedia of Life
 To World Register of Marine Species
 

husaensis
Gastropods described in 1940